Gilia ophthalmoides is a species of flowering plant in the phlox family known by the common name eyed gilia. It is native to the Southwestern United States where it can be found in woodlands and high desert plateau.

Description
This wildflower grows a short branching stem reaching 10 to 30 centimeters long and covered in a coating of cobweb-like fibers and whitish glandular hairs. The leaves mostly located at the ground in a basal rosette and are occasional along the stems. Each hairy leaf is divided into toothy leaflets.

The small flowers have tubular throats which are purplish to yellowish and a centimeter-wide corolla of light pink lobes. The fruit is a capsule a few millimeters long containing several seeds.

External links
Jepson Manual Treatment - Gilia ophthalmoides
Gilia ophthalmoides - Photo gallery

ophthalmoides
Flora of Nevada
Flora of Arizona
Flora of New Mexico
Flora of Colorado
Flora of Utah
Flora of Wyoming
Flora of the California desert regions
Flora of the Great Basin
Flora without expected TNC conservation status